Thomas Donnelly (born 12 March 1947) is a Scottish former footballer who played as a right half or inside right.

Having come to the attention of professional clubs as part of a successful school team at Cumnock Academy, Donnelly began his career at Rangers in 1964 but failed to break into the first team. Released in 1968, he joined  Motherwell and quickly became an important part of the team as they won the Scottish Division Two title in 1968–69 to regain the top-tier status they lost a year earlier. Donnelly's importance in the side began to diminish, and in 1971 he moved on to part-timers East Stirlingshire, where he was a regular for the next seven years before retiring via a spell with St Roch's in the junior leagues. By that point he had qualified as a school teacher in Glasgow.

His son Simon was also a footballer who played for clubs including Celtic and Partick Thistle, and for the Scottish national team.

References

Living people
1947 births
People educated at Cumnock Academy
Scottish schoolteachers
Footballers from Irvine, North Ayrshire
Scottish footballers
Association football wing halves
Association football inside forwards
Rangers F.C. players
East Stirlingshire F.C. players
St Roch's F.C. players
Motherwell F.C. players
Scottish Football League players
Scottish Junior Football Association players